Mika Norja is a Finnish professional ice hockey goaltender currently playing for Jukurit in the Finish Mestis.

Career

He started his pro career in the 2. Divisioona with Ankat before moving on to play for Ketterä in the Suomi-sarja league.  Mika played in this league until 2009-10 when he moved to RoKi in the Finnish Mestis.

In 2011-12 he signed with HIFK of the SM-liiga and played a total of 18 SM-liiga games over 2 seasons.  He was loaned out to several teams during his time with HIFK.

In 2013-14 he signed with Timrå IK in the HockeyAllsvenskan.

Career Stats
updated 20 November 2013

References

Living people
Timrå IK players
Finnish ice hockey goaltenders
1984 births
People from Lohja
Sportspeople from Uusimaa